The 1941 All-SEC football team consists of American football players selected to the All-Southeastern Conference (SEC) chosen by various selectors for the 1941 college football season. Mississippi State won the conference.

All-SEC selections

Ends
Holt Rast, Alabama (AP-1, UP-1)
Fergie Ferguson, Florida (AP-2, UP-1)
George Webb, Georgia Tech (AP-2)
Bill Hornick, Tulane (AP-3)
George Poschner, Georgia (AP-3)

Tackles
Ernie Blandin, Tulane (AP-1, UP-1)
Bill Arnold, Miss. St. (AP-2, UP-1)
Bill Eubanks, Ole Miss (AP-1)
Charles Sanders, Georgia Tech (AP-2)
Milton Hull, Florida (AP-3)
Chet Kozel, Ole Miss (AP-3)

Guards
Homer "Larry" Hazel, Jr., Ole Miss (AP-1, UP-1)
John Whyonic, Alabama  (AP-1, UP-1)
Jack Tittle, Tulane (AP-2)
Oscar Britt, Ole Miss (AP-2)
Walter Ruark, Georgia (AP-3)
George Hecht, Alabama (AP-3)

Centers
Bob Gude, Vanderbilt (AP-1, UP-1)
Bernie Lipkis, LSU (AP-2)
Ray Graves, Tennessee (College Football Hall of Fame) (AP-3)

Quarterbacks
Lloyd Cheatham, Auburn (AP-2, UP-1)

Halfbacks
Jimmy Nelson, Alabama (AP-1, UP-1)
Frank Sinkwich, Georgia (College Football Hall of Fame)  (AP-1, UP-1)
Merle Hapes, Ole Miss (AP-1)
John Hovious, Ole Miss (AP-2)
John Black, Miss. St. (AP-2)
Walter McDonald, Tulane (AP-2)
Cliff Kimsey, Georgia (AP-3)
Tommy Harrison, Florida (AP-3)
Bob Glass, Tulane (AP-3)
Noah Mullins, Kentucky (AP-3)

Fullbacks
Jack Jenkins, Vanderbilt (AP-1, UP-1)

Key

AP = Associated Press

UP = United Press.

Bold = Consensus first-team selection by both AP and UP

See also
1941 College Football All-America Team

References

All-SEC
All-SEC football teams